Starz is an American premium television channel owned by Starz Inc. Primarily a movie-based service, it began to introduce original programming in 2005 to compete with rival pay TV services HBO and Showtime.

Current programming

Drama

Comedy

Lionsgate+ regional original programming
These shows are originals because Starz commissioned or acquired them and had their premiere on the Lionsgate+ (previously Starzplay) service, but they are not available worldwide.

Upcoming programming

Drama

Continuations
These shows have been picked up by Starz for additional seasons after having aired previous seasons on another network.

Lionsgate+ regional original programming
These shows are originals because Starz commissioned or acquired them and will have their premiere on the Lionsgate+ (previously Starzplay) service, but they will not be available worldwide.

In development

Drama
Fightland
Kin
Lagordiloca
The Madonnas of Echo Park
Panther Baby
Queen Nzinga
Untitled Ava DuVernay project
Untitled Eleanor of Aquitaine project
Untitled Spartacus sequel series

Comedy
Book of Marlon
The Comedown
East Wing
 Plan A
Weeds 4.20

Miniseries
The Case of Cyntoia Brown

Unscripted
Untitled Fat Joe and Sean "Diddy Combs interview series

Former programming

Drama

Comedy

Miniseries

Unscripted

Docuseries

Variety

Co-productions

Continuations

Films

Notes

References

 
Starz